Nuria Martínez Segarra (born 3 January 2003) is a Spanish footballer who plays as a defender for Madrid CFF on loan from Levante.

Club career
Martínez started her career at Levante D and progressed through the levels at the club.

References

External links
Profile at La Liga

2003 births
Living people
Women's association football defenders
Spanish women's footballers
People from La Vall d'Uixó
Sportspeople from the Province of Castellón
Footballers from the Valencian Community
Levante UD Femenino players
Madrid CFF players
Primera División (women) players
Segunda Federación (women) players
Primera Federación (women) players
RCD Espanyol Femenino players